Amata rubritincta is a moth of the family Erebidae. It was described by George Hampson in 1903. It is found in Kenya, Rwanda, Tanzania and Uganda.

References

 

rubritincta
Moths described in 1903
Moths of Africa